Catherine Tift Merritt (born January 8, 1975) is an American singer-songwriter and musician. She has released seven studio albums, two for Lost Highway Records, two for Fantasy Records, and three for Yep Roc Records.

Early life and education
Merritt was born in Houston and grew up in Raleigh. She credits her father's eclectic taste in music as a major influence. At the age of 20, Merritt enrolled at the University of North Carolina at Chapel Hill to study creative writing.

Career
Merritt joined a band called the Carbines and played small clubs in the cities of Chapel Hill and Raleigh. In 1998, the band released a 7-inch single, "Jukejoint Girl," and in 1999 the album The Two Dollar Pistols with Tift Merritt on Yep Roc Records.

In 2000, Merritt won the MerleFest's Chris Austin Songwriting Contest and in 2002 released her debut album, Bramble Rose. The record landed on the top ten lists for both Time and The New Yorker, and was called the best debut of the year by the Associated Press. While touring to promote Bramble Rose, Merritt opened for fellow North Carolinian Ryan Adams, who had helped her secure her first management and record contracts.

Her follow-up release, 2004's Tambourine, was produced by George Drakoulias and featured backing by Benmont Tench, Mike Campbell, Neal Casal and Don Heffington. The album was nominated for a best country album Grammy Award in 2004. She was nominated for Americana Music Association: Album of the Year, Artist of the Year, and Song of the Year in 2005 Merritt's performance on Austin City Limits was released as a DVD on New West Records. A sold-out concert at the North Carolina Museum of Art in Raleigh, North Carolina, was released under the title Home Is Loud that same year.

Another Country
Released on Fantasy Records in 2008, Another Country featured guitarist Charlie Sexton. Merritt wrote the album in a Paris apartment. Paste magazine gave the album a four-star review. The song "Broken" was nominated for an Americana Music Award for Song of the Year. While touring England, Merritt recorded the album Buckingham Solo, which was released on Fantasy Records in April 2009.

Her EP, Please Break the Silence of the Middle of the Night, was released later in 2008.

Merritt has been the opening act for Joan Baez, Kris Kristofferson, and sang "The Star-Spangled Banner" for then-Senator Barack Obama at his last campaign rally.

See You on the Moon
Merritt's album, See You on the Moon, was released in June 2010 on Fantasy Records.

Traveling Alone, Merritt's first album on Yep Roc Records, was released in October 2012.

Reception
Merrit's sound has been described as "sonic short stories and poignant performances." She has been compared to artists like Joni Mitchell and Emmylou Harris.

A review in The New Yorker praised her and The Wall Street Journal included her in a weekend feature on singer-songwriters, describing her as "in the tradition of Joni Mitchell, James Taylor and Leonard Cohen".

Personal life
In 2009, Merritt married Zeke Hutchins. They separated in late 2013. In 2016, she and Eric Haywood had a daughter named Jean.

Discography

Studio albums

Live albums

Extended plays

Singles

Music videos

Appears on
 2003: Chatham County Line – Chatham County Line (Bonfire)
 2003: John Eddie – Who The Hell Is John Eddie? (Lost Highway
 2003: Portastatic – Autumn Was a Lark (Merge)
 2004: Chris Stamey – Travels in the South (Yep Roc)
 2006: Sally Spring – Mockingbird (Sniffinpup)
 2007: Charlie Louvin – Charlie Louvin (Tompkins Square)
 2007: Teddy Thompson – Upfront & Down Low (Verve Forecast)
 2010: Reto Burrell – Go (Echopark)
 2014: Andrew Bird – Things Are Really Great Here, Sort Of… (Wegawam Music)
 2016: Andrew Bird – Are You Serious (Loma Vista)
 2016: Hiss Golden Messenger – Heart Like A Levee (Merge)

Awards and nominations

References

External links
 
 
 

1975 births
Living people
American rock musicians
American alternative country singers
American women country singers
American country singer-songwriters
Musicians from Raleigh, North Carolina
Lost Highway Records artists
Fantasy Records artists
Musicians from Houston
University of North Carolina at Chapel Hill alumni
Singer-songwriters from North Carolina
Singer-songwriters from Texas
21st-century American singers
21st-century American women singers
Country musicians from Texas
Country musicians from North Carolina
Yep Roc Records artists